Dear is the compilation album (marketed as "special album") by South Korean girl group Apink, released on December 15, 2016. The album's lead single is the title track "Cause You're My Star".

Track listing

Charts

Album

Sales and certifications

References

External links 
 

Apink albums
2016 albums
Korean-language albums
Kakao M albums